George Louis Kline (March 3, 1921 – October 21, 2014) was a philosopher, translator (esp. of Russian philosophy and poetry), and prominent American specialist in Russian and Soviet philosophy, author of more than 300 publications, including two monographs, six edited or co-edited anthologies, more than 165 published articles, book chapters, and encyclopedia entries, over 55 translations, and 75 reviews. The majority of his works are in English, but translations of some of them have appeared in Russian, German, French, Spanish, Portuguese, Polish, Serbo-Croatian, Korean and Japanese. He is particularly noted for his authoritative studies on Spinoza, Hegel, and Whitehead. He was President of the Hegel Society of America (1984–86), and President of the Metaphysical Society of America (1985–86). He has also made notable contributions to the study of Marx and the Marxist tradition. He attended Boston University for three years (1938–41), but his education was interrupted by service in the U.S. Army Air Corps during WW II, for which he was awarded the Distinguished Flying Cross.

Career
After the war he completed his undergraduate education with honors at Columbia College, Columbia University (1947), followed by graduate degrees at Columbia University (M.A. 1948; Ph.D. 1950). He taught philosophy at Columbia University 1950–52 and 1953–59 and was Visiting Assistant Professor at the University of Chicago, 1952–53. He moved to Bryn Mawr College (Bryn Mawr, Pennsylvania) in 1959, initially teaching in both the philosophy and the Russian departments. He was appointed full Professor of Philosophy in 1961, becoming Milton C. Nahm Professor of Philosophy from 1981 until his retirement in 1991. Afterwards, Kline served as a professor of philosophy at Clemson University, South Carolina (1992–93). He also taught one-semester courses at Rutgers University, Johns Hopkins University, the University of Pennsylvania, Haverford College and Swarthmore College.

Beginning in 1952, at the University of Chicago, Kline first taught his famous course on "Russian Ethical and Social Theory"; it was subsequently taught at Columbia University through the 1950s, at Bryn Mawr College from 1960, and at a number of other institutions over the years. He also taught, more or less continuously, courses on the history of Russian philosophy, Russian and Soviet Marxism, and a number of courses on Russian literature.

The entire field of Russian philosophy as an object of study in America has been shaped to a remarkable degree by the efforts of Kline himself over the course of a long career, beginning with his first publications in 1949: "Dostoevsky's Grand Inquisitor and the Soviet Regime," Occidental (NY), no. 2, and "A Note on Soviet Logic," Journal of Philosophy, v. 46, p. 228. The textual precision, historical learning, and depth of insight found in Kline's own numerous studies of Russian and Soviet philosophy over several decades have served as a model of serious scholarship on these topics for many other researchers. He is also responsible for making available in English some of the most important reference works in the field, including the English translation of Zenkovsky's History of Russian Philosophy, and (with others) Russian Philosophy, a 3-vol. anthology of original translations of Russian philosophical texts, continuously in print from 1965 to the present.

Works in Slavic studies
Kline has also supplied a large number of entries on Russian philosophers for a variety of philosophical encyclopedias over many years. He has written approximately 75 reviews of other scholars' works on Russian and Soviet philosophy as well as of new Soviet philosophical works. For example, during the 1950s Kline reviewed approximately thirty recent Soviet publications in the fields of formal logic, philosophy of logic, and philosophy of mathematics, principally for the Journal of Symbolic Logic, as the field of formal logic was opening up in the U.S.S.R. He has also published several authoritative bibliographies of works in Russian, and also in other languages, concerning the history of Russian thought and culture, as well as a bibliography of Brodsky's published writings. Finally, Kline's skills as an editor are legendary. He contributed his services to a great many publishing ventures connected with Russian and Soviet philosophy, including the Sovietica series of monographs and the journal Studies in Soviet Thought. On a personal level, he most generously assisted in the editing of other scholars' drafts of works in philosophy, intellectual history, literature and literary criticism, and has been a constant source of encouragement and support for younger scholars. In all of these ways Kline has placed his own irreplaceable mark upon the entire field.

In 1949-50 Kline was in Paris as a Fulbright Scholar, just as V. V. Zenkovsky's История русской философии (2 vols., 1948 and 1950) was being published there. While in Paris Kline met Zenkovsky and volunteered to translate the History into English, completing it after returning to the U.S. During this process Zenkovsky introduced revisions and corrections for incorporation into the English translation, so that Kline's translation became the authoritative version of the text. This work became the standard history of Russian philosophy for the next half-century, a crucial reference source for all scholars of Russian philosophy. In addition to Kline's translation of Zenkovsky, another exceptionally important resource for English-speaking students of Russian philosophy has been the comprehensive three-volume collection of original translations of Russian philosophers from the 18th century (Skovoroda) up through early Soviet Marxism (Russian Philosophy, Ed. James M. Edie, James P. Scanlan and Mary-Barbara Zeldin with the Collaboration of George L. Kline, New York: Quadrangle Press, 1965; revised paperback ed. in 1969; reprinted by the University of Tennessee Press in 1976, 1984).

The appearance of these three volumes in the 1960s made it feasible for the first time for instructors in the U.S. and U.K. to teach university courses based upon a representative sampling of the entire history of Russian philosophy, with excellent translations and scholarly introductions for each general section and each philosopher. Kline contributed ten translations to these three volumes, revised a number of others, and advised the editors on which selections should be included. They commented that "Without his help and inspiration the publication of this historical anthology of Russian philosophy could have been neither successfully planned nor achieved."

Kline's own many studies of Russian and Soviet philosophy can be distributed into five main categories:
Religious thought in Russia and the Soviet Union
Russian and Soviet ethical thought
Studies of individual Russian philosophers
Marx, the Marxist tradition and Marxism–Leninism
Arguments for ethical individualism (though all four of these topics can sometimes be found interwoven in the same work)

The first category is well represented by Religious and Anti-Religious Thought in Russia (Chicago: University of Chicago Pr., 1968), based upon the six Weil Institute Lectures that Kline delivered in Cincinnati in 1964, examining a panorama of attitudes toward religion by ten Russian thinkers, treated in five pairs: Bakunin and Tolstoy (two versions of anarchism, anti-religious and religious), Konstantin Leontiev and Vasily Rozanov (religious neo-conservativisms), Lev Shestov and Nikolai Berdyaev (religious existential-isms), Maxim Gorky and Anatoly Lunacharsky (pseudo-religious "God-Building"), V. I. Lenin and Sergei M. Plekhanov (militant vs. moderate atheism).

Attitudes toward religion
Against the background of this extreme range of attitudes toward religion by various Russian thinkers, Kline concluded by examining three dominant attitudes toward religion in the then contemporary Soviet Union. They were:
The collectivist atheism of Marxist–Leninist ideology, which appeared to function as a kind of secular pseudo-religion for some of its most devout believers, an inversion of normal religious belief.
A "scientific-technological Prometheanism," somewhat analogous to Gorky's and Luncharsky's religion of "God-Building," which apparently inspired substantial numbers of the population, especially among the scientific and engineering elite. 
A genuinely religious sense of life which was emerging among some poets, writers and artists outside of the church, inspired by earlier writers such as Marina Tsvetaeva, Boris Pasternak and Anna Akhmatova.

Religious belief in Russia
 
Kline has published a number of important articles on aspects of religious belief in Russia, including "Religious Ferment Among Soviet Intellectuals," in Religion and the Soviet State: A Dilemma of Power ed. M. Hayward and W. C. Fletcher (New York: Praeger, 1969), and especially "Spor o religioznoi filosofii: L. Shestov protiv Vl. Solov'eva," Russkaia reigiozno-filosofskaia mysl; XX veka, ed. N. P. Poltoratzky (Pittsburgh: University of Pittsburgh, 1975) and "Russian Religious Thought" in Nineteenth Century Religious Thought in the West, ed. Ninian Smart, et al. (Cambridge: Cambridge UP, 1985). Russian and Soviet ethical theory have not only been at the center of much of Kline's teaching, but also of many of his publications. In "Changing Attitudes Toward the Individual" (in The Transformation of Russian Society:Aspects of Social Change since 1861, C. E. Black, Ed. (Cambridge: Harvard UP, 1960), Kline examined the entire range of Russian ethical/social thought from 1861, pursuing the question of the degree to which the freedom, worth and dignity of the human individual figured as crucial values in that tradition, and found that the weight of nineteenth-century Russian thought was clearly on the side of ethical individualism. Prior to the revolution, only "the collectivist tendencies of Leo Tolstoy, Vladimir Soloviev, and such Marxists as Bogdanov and Bazarov" seem to stand out as exceptions.

Nietzschean Marxism during the Soviet Silver Age
Kline was one of the first Western scholars to direct special attention to the episode of "Nietzschean Marxism" found especially in the works of Volsky and Lunacharsky, as well as Bogdanov and Bazarov during the period 1903–12. Three of his studies are especially relevant: "'Nietzschean Marxism' in Russia," (in Demythologizing Marxism, Frederick J. Adelmann, S.J., Ed. (Boston and The Hague: Nijhoff, 1969), and "The Nietzschean Marxism of Stanislav Volsky" in Western Philosophical Systems in Russian Literature, ed. Anthony Mlikotin (Los Angeles: University of Southern California Press, 1979). Kline's attention to "Nietzschean Marxism" has inspired work by a number of other researchers on this same theme: see Kline's "Foreword" in Nietzsche in Russia, ed. Bernice G. Rosenthal (Princeton: Princeton UP, 1986). Ethics and morality in the Soviet period have also been a continuing interest: "Current Soviet Morality" in Encyclopedia of Morals, ed. Vergilius Ferm (New York: Philosophical Library, 1956), "Economic Crime and Punishment," Survey, no. 57 (1965), "Soviet Ethical Theory," in Encyclopedia of Ethics, ed. Lawrence C. Becker (New York: Garland; London: St. James Press, 1992), and "The Soviet Recourse to the Death Penalty for Crimes Against Socialist Property (1961-1986)," Sofia Philosophical Review, vol. 3, 2009. (III)

Phenomenology in Marxist materialism
Kline's publications on individual Russian philosophers include fifteen entries in the first edition of The Encyclopedia of Philosophy, ed. Paul Edwards (1967), ten entries in the second edition, ed. Donald M. Borchert (2005), two entries in the Routledge Encyclopedia of Philosophy, ed Edward Craig (1998), plus individual entries in several others. Kline has published several studies on Gustav Shpet: "Meditations of a Russian Neo-Husserlian: Gustav Shpet's 'The Skeptic and his Soul'" in Phenomenology and Skepticism: Essays in Honor of James M. Edie, ed. Brice R. Wachterhauser (Evanston, Ill.: Northwestern UP, 1996); "Gustav Shpet as Interpreter of Hegel," in Archiwum Historii Filozofii i myśli społecznej, T. 44, 1999; "Shpet as Translator of Hegel's Phänomenologie des Geistes," in Gustav Shpet's Contribution to Philosophy and Cultural Theory, ed. Galin Tikhanov (W. Lafayette, Ind.: Purdue University Press, 2009). See also "The Hegelian Roots of S. L. Frank's Ethics and Social Philosophy," The Owl of Minerva, Vol. 25 (1994). (IV) Kline has published studies of Marx, the Marxist tradition and Soviet Marxism–Leninism throughout his career. One of his most important articles on Marx is "The Myth of Marx's Materialism" in Philosophical Sovietology: The Pursuit of a Science, ed. Helmut Dahm, Thomas J. Blakeley and George L. Kline (Dordrecht and Boston: Reidel, 1988).

There he denies that Marx ever promoted a materialist ontology in the normal philosophical sense, whereas most of his followers from Engels through Plekhanov and Lenin, plus all the Marxist-Leninists, have claimed that he did so. He identifies seven distinct senses of the adjective "materiell" as used by Marx, no one of which actually justifies the claim that Marx was committed to a materialist ontology. "Leszek Kolakowski and the Revision of Marxism" plus a "Bibliography of the Principal Writings of Leszek Kolakowski," published in European Philosophy Today, ed. George L. Kline (Chicago: Quadrangle Books, 1965) played a significant role in introducing the work of Kolakowski to American intellectuals. See also "Beyond Revisionism: Leszek Kolakowski's Recent Philosophical Development" and "Selective [Kolakowski] Bibliography," Triquarterly 22: A Kolakowski Reader (1971). In a similar vein, see "Georg Lukács in Retrospect: Impressions of the Man and his Ideas," Problems of Communism, vol. 21, No. 6 (1972), "Lukács's Use and Abuse of Hegel and Marx," in Lukács and His World: A Reassessment, ed. Ernest Joos (Frankfurt and New York: Peter Lang, 1987), and "Class Consciousness and the World-Historical Future" in Georg Lukács: Theory, Culture and Politics, ed. Judith Marcus and Zoltan Tarr (New Brunswick, NJ: Transaction Publishers, 1989).

Work on Spinoza
In 1952 Kline published Spinoza in Soviet Philosophy (London: Routledge & Kegan Paul; New York: Humanities Press), a study of the revival of Spinoza scholarship in the Soviet Union during the 1920s and 30's, including the emergence of conflicting Marxist schools of Spinoza interpretation. This work included translations by Kline of seven major articles on Spinoza published from 1923 to 1932, with a lengthy introduction. Other studies of Soviet Marxism–Leninism by Kline include "The Poverty of Marxism-Leninism," Problems of Communism, Vol. 19, No. 6 (1970) and "La Philosophie en Union Soviétique autour de 1930" in Histoire de la littérature russe, ed. Efim Etkind et al. (Paris: Payard, 1990). (V)

Set of Principles in political philosophy
Throughout his career, in an important series of essays stretching from 1953 to 2000, Kline has argued for the necessity of a genuine ethical individualism, an individualism of principles (and not of mere ideals, such as might be attributed to Marx or Nietzsche or Lenin). A genuine ethical individualism recognizes the intrinsic value of existing human beings, the primacy of their claims to self-realization and the enjoyment of value in the present, and rejects as illegitimate any attempt to treat them merely instrumentally, to sacrifice their lives in the name of some as-yet-unrealized future value or future state of society.

The background for Kline's argument of ethical individualism is contained in "Humanities and Cosmologies: The Background of Certain Humane Values," Western Humanities Review, Vol. 7 (1953); "Was Marx an Ethical Humanist?" in Studies in Soviet Thought, Vol. 9 (1969); and "The Use and Abuse of Hegel by Nietzsche and Marx," [Presidential Address to the Hegel Society of America] in Hegel and His Critics, ed. William Desmond (Albany, NY: SUNY Press, 1989). In "'Present', 'Past', and 'Future' as Categoreal Terms, and the 'Fallacy of the Actual Future'," Review of Metaphysics, Vol. 40 (1986) Kline argued that past, present, and future are genuine categorical terms  pace attempts by some physical theorists to claim that time is not a fundamental property of the real, that past and future are ontologically asymmetrical, that time-reversal is not possible (see irreversibility and Ilya Prigogine), and consequently that the present is ontologically prior.

It follows that any attempt to justify treating presently-living individuals as mere instruments for the realization of some alleged future good must involve the fallacy of the "actual future," i.e., the attempt to claim that the actuality of some (supposedly valuable) future state is sufficient to justify the actual sacrifice now of presently-living individuals. But such a claim is always necessarily false: the future is a realm of possibilities, and never of actualities.

More recently (in "Gustav Shpet as Interpreter of Hegel" [see above]), Kline pointed out that a strikingly similar argument was made by Shpet in his Filosofskoe mirovozrenie Gertsena (1921). Commenting on Herzen, Shpet agreed that those committed to a revolutionary quest for a future ideal "become cruel dreamers, strangers to the large and small joys of the present day, prepared...to sacrifice their own lives and the lives of others." Herzen, like Hegel, had a sense of the historical present as an end-in-itself (Selbstzweck). Shpet concluded that "for Herzen the individual person is not a 'future' ghostly person, but a person of the present day, alive and in the flesh, a real person, not a future one." Kline is also widely known as one of the most important early champions of Joseph Brodsky, translations of whose poetry Kline began to publish as early as 1965, several years before Brodsky was expelled from the Soviet Union. Kline is an exceptionally highly regarded translator of Russian poetry, including poems by Pasternak, Tsvetayeva and Voznesensky.

Works on A.N. Whitehead
Kline's work on Whitehead covers Whitehead's metaphysics and the influence Whitehead's ideas have had on other non-English speaking cultures.

Translator for Brodsky's poetry
However it is Klines long association with Brodsky, and his very numerous translations of Brodsky's poetry, for which he is particularly known. Kline first met Brodsky in Leningrad in August, 1967, and formed a close association as translator and friend. Between 1965 and 1989 Kline published translations of poems by Brodsky on more than thirty separate occasions in a variety of publishing venues, and played a leading role in the publication of both Ostanovka v pustyne (New York: izd. Chekhova, 1970) and Joseph Brodsky: Selected Poems, Trans. George L. Kline (New York: Harper & Row, 1973). Ostanovka v pustyne was the first Russian-language edition of his poetry for which Brodsky was able to make the main editorial choices, thanks to Kline's connection with him, but Kline's name did not appear on the original edition, in order to protect Brodsky, who was still in Leningrad. Selected Poems was the first volume of translations to appear after Brodsky came to the U.S. (and the first one for which Brodsky was able to participate directly in the editing process). Kline translated all the poems for this volume and wrote the "Introduction" for it. Brodsky gradually began taking a more active role in assisting with translations of his poetry by others; as early as 1980 he began publishing some of his own translations into English. In recognition of the long personal and professional bond between them, Brodsky invited Kline to attend the ceremony in Stockholm in 1987 when he was awarded the Nobel Prize for literature. In addition to his personal association with Brodsky, Kline has also had personal connections with Lukacs, Kolakowski, Marcuse and Losev. Both Brodsky and Kolakowski attended and made presentations for Kline's retirement ceremony at Bryn Mawr in 1991.

In 1999 Kline received the award of the American Association for the Advancement of Slavic Studies for "Distinguished Contributions to Slavic Studies." In addition to citing his remarkable scholarly career as a philosopher, translator, editor and teacher, the citation went on "to call particular attention to his extraordinary impact on his fellow scholars, many of whom have been his students. They recall his erudite, generous, and detailed comments on their papers and books, and the depth and wisdom he brought to his scholarship. Countless younger scholars consider themselves indebted to him for his judgment, encouragement, and guidance. We all stand in his debt, therefore, for helping us to appreciate the richness and depth of Russian philosophy and literature and for his long dedication to nurturing our field."

Higher education
Boston University 1938–1941 (no degree)

Columbia College, Columbia University, NY 1946-1947: A.B. (with honors) 1947

Columbia University: M.A., 1948

Columbia University: Ph.D. 1950

Audited several philosophy courses in Paris at the Sorbonne (1949-1950 and 1954–1955), and at the Collège de France (1954-1955; one was taught by Maurice Merleau-Ponty) (no degree)

Teaching experience
Columbia University, Instructor in Philosophy (1950-1952)

University of Chicago, Visiting Assistant Professor of Philosophy (1952-1953)

Columbia University, Assistant Professor of Philosophy (1953-1959)

Bryn Mawr College, Visiting Lecturer in Philosophy and Russian (1959-1960); Associate Professor of Philosophy and Russian (1960-1966); Professor of Philosophy (1966-1981); Milton C. Nahm Professor of Philosophy (1981-1991); Milton C. Nahm Professor Emeritus of Philosophy (1991- ); Katharine E. McBride Professor of Philosophy (1992-1993)

Clemson University, SC, Adjunct Research Professor of the History of Ideas (2005- ).

Professor Kline taught one-semester courses as a visiting professor at Douglass College (Rutgers University), Johns Hopkins University, the University of Pennsylvania, Haverford College, and Swarthmore College (twice).

Bibliography
Spinoza in Soviet Philosophy, London: Routledge and Kegan Paul; New York: Humanities Press, 1952; reprint: Westport, CT: Hyperion Press, 1981. (Partial German translation, by Brigitte Scheer, in Texte zur Geschichte des Spinozismus [ed. Norbert Altwicker], Darmstadt: Wissenschaftliche Buchgesellschaft, 1971)

Religious and Anti-Religious Thought in Russia (The Weil Lectures), Chicago: University of Chicago Press, 1968. Nominated for the Ralph Waldo Emerson award given by the Phi Beta Kappa Society.

Editor:

Soviet Education (foreword by George S. Counts), London: Routledge and Keagan Paul; New York: Columbia University Press, 1957. (Portuguese translation by J. G. Moraes Filho, São Paulo, Brazil, 1959.)

Editor and introducer:

Alfred North Whitehead: Essays on His Philosophy (A Spectrum Book), Englewood Cliffs, NJ: Prentice-Hall, 1963. Corrected reprint, with new preface: Lanham, MD: University Press of America, 1989.

Editor and contributor of a chapter and a translation from the Spanish:

European Philosophy Today (preface by Max H. Fisch), Chicago: Quadrangle Books, 1965.

Co-editor, (unidentified) author of the Preface, and contributor of several translations from the Russian:

Russian Philosophy (co-edited with James M. Edie, James P. Scanlan, and Mary-Barbara Zeldin), three volumes, Chicago: Quadrangle Books, 1965; revised paperback edition, 1969; reprint Knoxville: University of Tennessee Press, 1976, 1984. (Korean translation by Choung Hae-chang, Seoul: KoreaOne, 1992.)

Co-editor:

Iosif Brodskii: Ostanovka v pustyne (Joseph Brodsky: A Halt in the Desert) (coedited with Max Hayward, although, to protect Brodsky, Kline not named), New York: Izdatel'stvo imeni Chekhova, 1970. Reprint with corrections: Ann Arbor: Ardis, 1988. Reprint with further corrections and with both editors clearly identified: New York: Slovo/Word and St. Petersburg: Pushkinskii Fond, 2000.

Co-editor and contributor:

Explorations in Whitehead's Philosophy (co-edited with Lewis S. Ford), New York: Fordham University Press, 1983.

Philosophical Sovietology: The Pursuit of a Science (co-edited with Helmut Dahm and Thomas J. Blakeley), Dordrecht and Boston: Reidel, 1988.

Translator:

V. V. Zenkovsky, A History of Russian Philosophy, two volumes, London: Routledge and Kegan Paul; New York: Columbia University Press, 1953; reprint: London: Routledge, 2003.

Boris Pasternak, Seven Poems, Santa Barbara, CA: Unicorn Press, 1969; second edition, 1972.

Translator and introducer:

Joseph Brodsky: Selected Poems (foreword by W. H. Auden), London: Penguin Books, 1973 (series "Modern European Poets"); New York: Harper and Row, 1974; Baltimore, MD: Penguin Books, 1974.

MAJOR ARTICLES:

"The Existentalist Rediscovery of Hegel and Marx" in Sartre: A Collection of Critical Essays (ed. M. Warnock), Garden City, LI: Anchor Books, 1971, 284–314. Reprinted from the 2nd 1969 edition of Phenomenology and Existentialism (ed. E. N. Lee and M. Mandelbaum), Baltimore: The Johns Hopkins Press.

"Absolute and Relative Senses of Liberum and Libertas in Spinoza" in Spinoza nel 350 Anniversario della Nascita (ed. Emilia Giancotti), Naples: Bibliopolis, 1985, 259–280.

"Russian Religious Thought" in Nineteenth Century Religious Thought in the West (ed. Ninian Smart, et al.), Cambridge: Cambridge University Press, 1985, Vol. 2, Ch. 6: 179–229.

"'Present', 'Past', and 'Future' as Categoreal Terms, and the 'Fallacy of the Actual Future'," Review of Metaphysics, Vol. 40 (1986), 215–35. (Kline's presidential address to the Metaphysical Society of America.)

"The 1987 Nobel Prize in Literature: Joseph Brodsky" in Dictionary of Literary Biography: 1987" (ed. J. M. Brook), Detroit: Gale Research, 1988, 3–13.

"The Myth of Marx's Materialism" in Philosophical Sovietology: The Pursuit of a Science (ed. Helmut Dahm, Thomas J. Blakeley, and George L. Kline), Dordrecht and Boston: Reidel, 1988, 158–203. Reprinted in Marx (The International Library of Critical Essays in the History of Philosophy) (ed. Scott Meikle), Aldershot, England: Ashgate, 2002, 27–72.

"The Use and Abuse of Hegel by Nietzsche and Marx" in Hegel and His Critics: Philosophy in the Aftermath of Hegel (ed. William Desmond), Albany: State University of New York Press, 1989, 1-34. (Kline's presidential address to the Hegel Society of America.)

"Gustav Shpet as Interpreter of Hegel" in Archiwum Historii Filozofii i Myśli Spolecznej (Warsaw) (ed. Z Ogonowski), Vol. 44 (1999), 181–190.

"The Soviet Recourse to the Death Penalty for Crimes Against Socialist Property (1961-1986)," Sofia Philosophical Review, Vol. 3 (2009), 45–74.

Six articles have appeared in Russian, four in German, two each in French, Japanese, Polish, and Spanish, and one each in Chinese, Italian, and Serbo-Croatian.

MAJOR REVIEWS:

Review of V. V. Zen'kovskii, Istoriia russkoi filosofii, t. 1 (1948), Journal of Philosophy [hereafter: JP], Vol. 47 (1950), 263–266.

Review of S. A. Ianovskaia, Osnovaniia matematiki i matematicheskaia logika, Journal of Symbolic Logic, Vol. 16 (1951), 46–48.

Review of J. M. Bocheński, Der sowjetrussische dialektische Materialismus (Diamat (1950), JP, Vol. 49 (1952), 123–131.

Review of V. V. Zen'kovskii, Istoriia russkoi filosofii, t. 2 (1950), JP, Vol. 50 (1953), 183–191.

Review of N. A. Berdiaev, Dream and Reality: An Essay in Autobiography (trans. by K. Lampert) (1951), JP, Vol. 50 (1953), 441–446.

Review of José Ferrater Mora, El Hombre en la encrucijada (1952), Ethics, Vol. 64, (1953-1954): 62–63.

Review of Isaiah Berlin, The Hedgehog and the Fox: An Essay on Tolstoy's View of History (1953), Ethics, Vol. 64 (1954), 313–315.

Review of Rodolfo Mondolfo, Il Materialismo storico in Federico Engels (1952), JP, Vol. 51 (1954), 383–389.

Review of William A. Christian, An Interpretation of Whitehead's Metaphysics (1959), Ethics, Vol. 70 (1960), 337–340.

Review of Bertram D. Wolfe, An Ideology in Power: Reflections on the Russian Revolution (1969), Studies in Comparative Communism, Vol. 3 (1970), 162–169.

Review of Lucian Boia, La Mythologie scientifique du communisme (1993), The Russian Review, Vol. 56 (1997), 307–308.

HONORS AND AWARDS

Distinguished Flying Cross (1944)

Phi Beta Kappa, New York Delta (1947)

Deutscher Verein Prize, Columbia College (1947)

Weil Lecturer (six lectures), The Frank L. Weil Institute for Studies in Religion and the

Humanities, Cincinnati (1964)

Guggenheim Fellowship, Paris (1978-1979)

Stork Lecturer, The Philadelphia Athenaeum (1988)

Distinguished Career Award, Needham High School (MA) (1995)

Award for Distinguished Contributions to Slavic Studies from the American Association for the

Advancement of Slavic Studies [now: the Association for Slavic, East European, and Eurasian Studies] (1999)

Honorary Member, Zenkovsky Society of Historians of Russian Philosophy, Moscow (2002-)

Russkaia filosofiia Entsiklopediia edited by Mark Andrew Maslin Published : 2007

List of articles
"Dostoevsky's Grand Inquisitor and the Soviet Regime," Occidental (New York), No. 2 (1949): 1–5.

"Recent Philosophical Developments at Oxford," Occidental, No. 9-10 (1949): 1–3.

"To the Editors of the Journal of Philosophy," [A Note on Soviet Logic], Journal of Philosophy, [hereafter JP], Vol. 46 (1949): 228.

"The Concept of Justice in Soviet Philosophy," The Standard (New York), Vol. 39 (1952): 231–236.

"Humanities and Cosmologies: The Background of certain Humane Values," Western Humanities Review, Vol.7 (1953): 95–103.

"Russian Philosophy," Collier's Encyclopedia, 6th printing, 1953, Vol.17, 222-225

"A Philosophical Critique of Soviet Marxism," Review of Metaphysics[hereafter RM], Vol. 9 (1955): 90–105.

"Darwinism and the Russian Orthodox Church" in Continuity and Change in Russian and Soviet Thought (ed. Ernest J. Simmons), Cambridge: Harvard University Press, 1955, 307–328. (This volume was reprinted by Russell and Russell, New York, in 1967.)

"Recent Soviet Philosophy," Annals of the American Academy of Political and Social Science, Vol. 303 (1956): 126–138. (Japanese translation, by Seiji Uyeta, 1956.)

"Russian Philosophy" in A Dictionary of Russian Literature (ed. William E. Harkins), New York: Philosophical Library, 1956, 288–300. (Paperback edition, 1959.)

"Current Soviet Morality" in Encyclopedia of Morals (ed. Vergilius Ferm), New York: Philosophical Library, 1956, 569–580.

"Materialisticheskaia filosofiia i sovremennaia nauka" ("Materialist Philosophy and Contemporary Science"), Mosty [Bridges] (Munich), No. 1 (1958): 273–286.

"Education toward Literacy," Current History, Vol. 35, No. 203 (1958): 17- 21.

"Russia Five Years after Stalin, No. 11: Education," New Leader [hereafter NL], Vol. 41, No. 24 (1958): 6–10.

"Fundamentals of Marxist Philosophy: A Critical Analysis," Survey, No. 30 (1959): 58–62.

"Russia's Lagging School System," NL, Vol. 42, No 11 (1959): 12–16. (Spanish translation by Raquel Amadeo de Passalacqua, 1960.)

"Philosophy and Religion" in American Research on Russia (ed. Harold H. Fisher; Intro. by Philip L. Mosely), Bloomington: Indiana University Press, 1959, 66–76.

"Changing Attitudes toward the Individual" in The Transformation of Russian Society: Aspects of Social Change since 1861 (ed. Cyril E. Black), Cambridge: Harvard University Press, 1960, 606–625.

"Spinoza East and West: Six Recent Studies in Spinozist Philosophy," JP, Vol. 58 (1961): 346–355.

"Philosophy" in Encyclopedia of Russia and the Soviet Union (ed. Michael T. Florinsky), New York: McGraw Hill, 1961, 422–425.

"The Withering Away of the State: Philosophy and Practice" in The Future of Communist Society (ed. Walter Laqueur and Leopold Labedz), New York: Praeger, 1962, 63–71. (Originally in Survey [London], No. 38, 1961.)

Bibliography of works in Russian on "History of Thought and Culture" (items 1172–1209) in Basic Russian Publications: A Selected and Annotated Bibliography on Russia and the Soviet Union (ed. Paul L. Horecky), Chicago: University of Chicago Press, 1962, 224–230.

"A Discrepancy," Studies in Soviet Thought [hereafter SST], Vol. 2 (1962): 327–330.

"Soviet Culture since Stalin," Survey, No. 47 (1963): 71–73.

"Socialist Legality and Communist Ethics," Natural Law Forum, Vol. 8 (1963): 21–34.

"Theoretische Ethik im russischen Frühmarxismus," Forschungen zur osteuropäischen Geschichte, Vol. 9 (1963): 269–279. (Japanese translation from the English manuscript by Kichitaro Katsuda, 1962.)

"Soviet Philosophers at the Thirteenth International Philosophy Congress," JP, Vol. 60 (1963): 738–743.

"Cultural Trends" [in the Soviet Union in the decade following Stalin's death]. Survey No. 47 (April 1963): 71–72.

"Some Recent Reinterpretations of Hegel's Philosophy," Monist, Vol. 48 (1964): 34–75.

"Philosophy, Ideology, and Policy in the Soviet Union," Review of Politics, Vol. 26 (1964): 174–190.

"Whitehead in the Non-English-Speaking World" and "Bibliography of Writings by and about A. N. Whitehead in Languages other than English" in Process and Divinity: The Hartshorne

Festschrift, (ed. William Reese and Eugene Freeman), LaSalle, IL: Open Court, 1964, 235-268 and 593–609.

"Marx, the Manifesto, and the Soviet Union Today," Ohio University Review, Vol. 6 (1964): 63–76.

Bibliography of works in languages other than Russian on "History of Thought and Culture" (items 1563–1626) in Russia and the Soviet Union: A Bibliographic Guide to Western-Language Publications (ed, Paul L. Horecky), Chicago: University of Chicago Press, 1964, 324–335.

"Philosophic Revisions of Marxism," Proceedings of the Thirteenth International Congress of Philosophy (Mexico City, 1963), Mexico, D. F.: Universidad Nacional Autónoma de México, 1964, Vol. 9: 397–407.

"N. A. Vasil'ev and the Development of Many-Valued Logics" in Contributions to Logic and Methodology in Honor of J. M. Bocheński (ed. Anna-Teresa Tymieniecka and Charles Parsons), Amsterdam: North Holland, 1965, 315–326.

"Economic Crime and Punishment," Survey, No. 57 (1965): 67–72.

"Leszek Kołakowski and the Revision of Marxism" and "Bibliography of the Principal Writings of Leszek Kołakowski" in European Philosophy Today (ed. George L. Kline), Chicago: Quadrangle Books, 1965, 113-156 and 157–163. (Reprinted, without footnotes or bibliography, in New Writing of East Europe [ed. George Gömöri and Charles Newman], Chicago: Quadrangle Books, 1968, 82–101.)

Fifteen articles on Russian philosophy and philosophers in The Encyclopedia of Philosophy (ed. Paul Edwards), New York: Macmillan and Free Press, 1967, (8 vols.): Bazarov, V. A., 1: 262; Bogdanov, A. A., 1: 331; Chicherin, B. N., 2:86-87; Frank, S.L., 3:219-220; Leontyev, K. N., 4:436-437; Lunacharski, A. V., 5:109; Pisarev, D. I., 6:312; "Russian Philosophy," 7:258-268; Shestov, Leon, 7:432-433; Skovoroda, G. S., 7:461; Solovyov, V. S., 7:491-493; Volski, Stanislav, 7:261-262.

"Some Critical Comments on Marx's Philosophy" in Marx and the Western World (ed. Nicholas Lobkowicz), Notre Dame, IN: University of Notre Dame Press, 1967, 419-432

"Philosophy Holdings in Soviet and East European Libraries," SST, Vol. 7, No. 2 (1967):69-75.:

"The Existentialist Rediscovery of Hegel and Marx" in Phenomenology and Existentialism (ed. Edward N. Lee and Maurice Mandelbaum), Baltimore: The Johns Hopkins Press, 1967, 113–138. (Revised paperback ed., 1969.) Reprinted in Sartre: A collection of Critical Essays (ed. Mary Warnock), Anchor Books, 1971, 284–314.

"Randall's Reinterpretation of the Philosophies of Descartes, Spinoza, and Leibniz" in Naturalism and Historical Understanding: Essays on the Philosophy of John Herman Randall Jr. (ed. John P. Anton), Albany: State University of New York Press, 1967, 83–93.

"Was Marx an Ethical Humanist?" in Proceedings of the Fourteenth International Congress of Philosophy (Vienna, 1968), Vienna: Herder, 1968, Vol. 2, 69–73. Revised and expanded, with German abstract, in SST, Vol. 9 (1969): 91–103.

"More on the Convergence Theory," The Humanist, Vol. 29 (1969): 24.

"Vico in Pre-Revolutionary Russia" in Giambattista Vico: An International Symposium (ed. Giorgio Tagliacozzo and Hayden V. White), Baltimore: The Johns Hopkins Press, 1969, 203–213.

"Philosophy" in Language and Area Studies: East Central and Southeastern Europe – a Survey (ed. Charles Jelavich), Chicago: University of Chicago Press, 1969, 285–300.

"The Varieties of Instrumental Nihilism" in New Essays in Phenomenology: Studies in the Philosophy of Experience (ed. James M. Edie), Chicago: Quadrangle Books, 1969, 177–189.

"Religious Ferment among Soviet Intellectuals" in Religion and the Soviet State: A Dilemma of Power (ed. Max Hayward and William Fletcher), New York: Praeger, 1969, 57–69.

" 'Nietzschean Marxism' in Russia" in Demythologizing Marxism (ed. Frederick J. Adelmann, S. J.), Vol. 2 of Boston College Studies in philosophy, Boston and The Hague: Nijhoff, 1969, 166–183.

"The Past: Agency or Efficacy?" in Proceedings of the Fourteenth International Congress of Philosophy (Vienna, 1968), University of Vienna, Herder Verlag, 1969, Vol. 4, 580–584.

"Religious Motifs in Russian Philosophy," Studies on the Soviet Union [Munich], Vol. 9 (1969): 84–96.

"Form, Concrescence, and Concretum: A Neo-Whiteheadian Analysis," Southern Journal of Philosophy, Vol. 7 (1969-1970): 351–360.

"Responsibility, Freedom, and Statistical Determination" in Human Values and Natural Science (ed. Ervin Laszlo and James B. Wilbur), London and New York: Gordon and Breach Science Publishers, 1970, 213–220.

"Hegel and the Marxist-Leninist Critique of Religion" and "Reply to Commentators" in Hegel and the Philosophy of Religion (ed. Darrel E. Christensen), The Hague: Nijhoff, 1970, 187-202 and 212–215.

"The Dialectic of Action and Passion in Hegel's Phenomenology of Spirit," RM, Vol. 23 (1970): 679–689.

"The Poverty of Marxism-Leninism," Problems of Communism, Vol. 19, No. 6 (Nov.-Dec. 1970): 42–45.

Contribution to author-reviewers symposium (devoted to George Kateb's Utopia and its Enemies; the other reviewer was Harry Neumann), Philosophy Forum, Vol. 10, (1971): 323–328.

"Religious Themes in Soviet Literature" in Aspects of Religion in the Soviet Union: 1917-1967 (ed. Richard H. Marshall Jr. with Thomas E. Bird and Andrew Q. Blane), Chicago: University of Chicago Press, 1971, 157–186.

"A Bibliography of the Published Writings of Iosif Aleksandrovich Brodsky," Russian Literature TriQuarterly, No. 1 (1971): 441–445. Reprinted, with Addenda, in Ten Bibliographies of Twentieth Century Russian Literature (ed. Fred Moody), Ann Arbor, MI: Ardis, 1977, 159–175.

"Beyond Revisionism: Leszek Kolakowski's Recent Philosophical Development" and "Selective [Kolakowski] Bibliography," TriQuarterly 22: A Kolakowski Reader, (1971): 13-47 and 239–250.

Comment on Bohdan Bociurkiw "Religious Dissent and the Soviet State" in Papers and Proceedings of the McMaster Conference on Dissent in the Soviet Union (ed. Peter J. Potichnyj), Hamilton, Ont., 1972, 113–119.

"Georg Lukács in Retrospect: Impressions of the Man and His Ideas," Problems of Communism, Vol. 21, No. 6 (Nov.-Dec. 1972): 62–66.

"Religion, National Character, and the 'Rediscovery of Russian Roots'," Slavic Review, Vol. 32 (1973): 29–40. (Discussion of an article by Jack V. Haney; the other discussant was Thomas E. Bird.)

"A Poet's Map of his Poem" (interview with Joseph Brodsky), Vogue, Vol. 162, No. 3 (Sept. 1973): 228, 230. (Reprinted in Cynthia Haven, ed., Joseph Brodsky's Conversations, 2002, 36–39.)

"Translating Brodsky," Bryn Mawr Now, Spring 1974: 1.

"Hegel and Solovyov" in Hegel and the History of Philosophy (ed. Keith W. Algozin, Joseph J. O'Malley, and Frederick G. Weiss), The Hague: Nijhoff, 1974, 159–170.

"Philosophical Puns" in Philosophy and the Civilizing Arts: Essays Presented to Herbert W. Schneider on his Eightieth Birthday (ed. John P. Anton and Craig Walton), Athens, OH: Ohio University Press, 1974, 213–235.

"Was Marx von Hegel hätte lernen können ... und sollen" ["What Marx Could ... and Should have Learned from Hegel"] in Stuttgarter Hegel-Tage 1970 (Hegel-Studien, Beiheft 11) (ed. Hans-Georg Gadamer), Bonn: Bouvier Verlag, 1974, 497–502.

"Recent Uncensored Soviet Philosophical Writings" [on works of Volpin, Chalidze, and Pomerants] in Dissent in the USSR: Politics, Ideology, and People (ed. Rudolf L. Tökés), Baltimore: Johns Hopkins University Press, 1975, 158–190.

"Spor o religioznoi filosofii: L. Shestov protiv Vl. Solov'eva ["A Dispute about Religious Philosophy: Shestov verses Solovyov' "] in Russkaia religiozno-filosofskaia mysl' XX veka [Russian Religious and Philosophic Thought in the Twentieth Century] (ed. N. P. Poltoratsky), Pittsburgh: University of Pittsburgh, Department of Slavic Languages and Literatures, 1975, 37–53.

"Working with Brodsky," Paintbrush, Vol. 4, No. 7-8 (1977): 25–26.

"On the Infinity of Spinoza's Attributes" in Speculum Spinozanum, 1677-1977 (ed. Siegfried Hessing; pref. by Huston Smith), London: Routledge and Kegan Paul, 1977, 333–352.

"Three Dimensions of 'Peaceful Coexistence'" in Varieties of Christian-Marxist Dialogue (ed. Paul Mojzes), Philadelphia: Ecumenical Press, 1978, 201–206. (Originally in Journal of Ecumenical Studies, Vol. 15 [1978]XXX)

"Iosif Aleksandrovich Brodskii (Joseph Brodsky)" (with Richard D. Sylvester) in Modern Encyclopedia of Russian and Soviet Literature (ed. Harry Weber), Vol. 3 (1979), 129–137.

"The 'Nietzschean Marxism' of Stanislav Volsky" in Western Philosophical Systems in Russian Literature: A Collection of Critical Studies (ed. Anthony M. Mlikotin), Los Angeles: University of Southern California Press, 1979, 177–195.

"Life as Ontological Category: A Whiteheadian Note on Hegel" in Art and Logic in Hegel's Philosophy (ed. Kenneth L. Schmitz and Warren E. Steinkraus), New York: Humanities Press, 1980, 158–162.

"Comment--Ethnicity, Orthodoxy, and the Return to the Russian Past" in Ethnic Russia in the USSR: The Dilemma of Dominance (ed. Edward Allworth), New York: Pergamon Press, 1980, 137–141.

Articles on Joseph Brodsky, Lev Shestov, and Vladimir Solovyov in Columbia Dictionary of Modern European Literature (ed. William B. Edgerton), New York: Columbia University Press, 1980, 121–122, 738, 757.

"The Myth of Marx's Materialism" (abstract), JP, Vol. 77 (1980): 655

"Mary Barbara Zeldin (1922-1981)," SST, Vol. 23 (1982): 91–93,.

Introductory note and explanatory footnotes to "W. H. Auden, 'On Chaadaev'," Russian Review, Vol. 42 (1983): 409–416.

"Revising Brodsky" in Modern Poetry in Translation: 1983 (ed. Daniel Weissbort) London: Carcanet, (1983): 159–168.

"The Question of Materialism in Vico and Marx" in Vico and Marx: Affinities and Contrasts (ed. Giorgio Tagliacozzo), Atlantic Highlands, NJ: Humanities Press, 1983, 114–125.

"Los males del totalitarismo comunista yacen en el pensamiento del propio Marx", Nuesto Tiempo [Pamplona, Spain], Vol. 58. (1983): 47. (Response to an international inquiry on the occasion of the centennial of Marx's death)

"Form, Concrescence, and Concretum" in Explorations in Whitehead's Philosophy (ed. Lewis S. Ford and George L. Kline), New York: Fordham University Press, 1983, 104–146. (This is a greatly expanded and substantially revised version of No. 51 above).

"The Myth of Marx's Materialism,' Annals of Scholarship, Vol. 3, No. 2 (1984): 1-38.

"Joseph Brodsky" in Contemporary Foreign Language Writers (ed. James Vinson and Daniel Kirkpatrick), New York: St. Martin's Press, 1984, 53–54.

"Absolute and Relative Senses of Liberum and Libertas in Spinoza" in Spinoza nel 350 Anniversario della Nascita: Atti del Congresso Internazionale (Urbino 1982) (ed. Emilia Giancotti), Naples: Bibliopolis, 1985, 259–280.

Articles on Pyotr Y. Chaadaev and Nikolai O. Lossky in Handbook of Russian Literature (ed. Victor Terras), New Haven: Yale University Press, 1985, 76-77 and 256–66.

"Russian Religious Thought" in Nineteenth Century Religious Thought in the West (ed. Ninian Smart, et al.), Cambridge: Cambridge University Press, 1985, Vol. 2, Ch. 6: 179–229.

"Les Interprétations russes de Spinoza (1796-1862) et leurs sources allemandes," Les Cahiers de Fontenay, No. 36-38 (1985): 361–377. (Translated by Jacqueline Lagrée.)

"Concept and Concrescence: An Essay in Hegelian-Whiteheadian Ontology" in Hegel and Whitehead: Contemporary Perspectives on Systematic Philosophy (ed. George R. Lucas Jr.), Albany: State University of New York Press, 1986, 133–151.

"'Present', 'Past', and 'Future' as Categorical Terms, and the 'Fallacy of the Actual Future'," Review of Metaphysics, Vol. 40(1986): 215–235.

"Foreword" in Nietzsche in Russia (ed. Bernice G. Rosenthal), Princeton, NJ: Princeton University Press, 1986, xi-xvi.

"Lukács's Use and Abuse of Hegel and Marx" in Lukács and His World: A Reassessment (ed. Ernest Joós), Frankfurt and New York: Peter Lang, 1987, 1-25.

"The 1987 Nobel Prize in Literature: Joseph Brodsky" in Dictionary of Literature Biography Yearbook: 1987 (ed. J. M. Brook), Detroit: Gale Research Co., 1988, 3–13.

"The Myth of Marx's Materialism" in Philosophical Sovietology: The Pursuit of a Science (ed. Helmut Dahm, Thomas J. Blakeley, and George L. Kline), Dordrecht and Boston: Reidel, 1988, 158–203. (This is an expanded and revised version of No. 84 above.)

"George L. Kline: Writings on Russian and Soviet Philosophy" in ibid., 204–13.

"George L. Kline: Writings on Marx, Engels, and Non-Russian Marxism" in ibid, 214–17.

"Russische und westeuropäische Denker über Tradition, Gegenwart und Zukunft" (trans. Edda Werfel) in Europa und die Folgen: Castelgandolfo-Gespräche 1987 (ed. Krzysztof Michalski), Stuttgart: Klett-Cotta, 1988, 146–64.

"Class Consciousness and the World-Historical Future: Some Critical Comments on Lukács's 'Will to the Future'" in Georg Lukács: Theory, Culture, and Politics (ed. Judth Marcus and Zoltán Tarr), New Brunswick, NJ: Transaction Publishers, 1989, 15–26. (An earlier version of this paper appeared in Hungary and European Civilization [ed. György Ránki], Budapest: Akadémiai Kiadó, 1989, 449–465. Both of these versions are variations on No. 93 above.)

"Revising Brodsky" in Translating Poetry (ed. Daniel Weissbort), London Macmillan,1989, 95–106. (Corrected and revised reprint of No. 80 above.)

"The Use and Abuse of Hegel by Nietzsche and Marx" in Hegel and His Critics: Philosophy in the Aftermath of Hegel (ed. William Desmond), Albany: State University of New York Press, 1989, 1-34.

"Reuniting the Eastern and Western Churches: Vladimir Soloviev's Ecumenical Project (1881-1896) and its Contemporary Critics," Transactions of the Association of Russian-American Scholars in the U.S.A. (Zapiski russkoi akademicheskoi gruppy v SSHA), Vol. 21 (1988): 209–25.

"Variations on the Theme of Exile" in Brodsky's Poetics and Aesthetics (ed. Lev Loseff and Valentina Polukhina), London: Macmillan, 1990, 56–88.

"Pierre Macherey's Hegel ou Spinoza" in Spinoza: Issues and Directions (ed. Edwin Curley and Pierre-François Moreau), Leiden: E. J. Brill, 1990, 373–80.

"La Philosophie en Union Soviétique autour de 1930" in Histoire de la littérature russe: Le XX siècle, Gels et dégels (ed. Efim Etkind, Georges Nivat, Ilya Serman, and Vittorio Strada), Paris: Payard, 1990, 256–66. (French translation by Marc Weinstein.)

"Begriff und Konkreszenz: über einige Gemeinsamkeiten in den Ontologien Hegels und Whiteheads" in Whitehead und der deutsche Idealismus (ed. George R. Lucas Jr., and Antoon Braeckman), Bern-Frankfurt-New York-Paris: Peter Lang, 1990, 145–61. (An abridged German version of No. 90 above.)

"Present, Past, and Future in the Writings of Alexander Herzen," Synthesis Philosophica

[Zagreb], Vol. 5 (1990): 183–93. (Abstracts in English, French, and German.)

"Sadašnost, prošlost I budućnost u spisima Aleksandra Herzena," Filozofska istraživanja [Zagreb], Vol. 10 (1990): 715–24. (Serbo-Croatian translation by Anto Knežević of No. 106 above. Abstract in English.)

Rosyjscy i zachodnoeuropejscy myśliciele o tradycji, nowoczesności i przyszlości" in Europa i co z tego wynika (ed. Krysztof Michalski), Warsaw: Res Publica, 1990, 159–74. (Polish translation by Jerzy Szacki of No. 98 above.)

"Pojednanie Kościoła wschodniego i zachodniego: Plan ekumeniczny Władimira Sołowjowa (1881-1896) i współcześni mu krytycy," Przegląd powszechny [Warsaw], Vol. 109, No. 3 (1992): 370–91. (Polish translation by Ewa Okuljar of No. 102 above: English text and Russian and French quotations.)

"Soviet Ethical Theory" in Encyclopedia of Ethics (ed. Lawrence C. Becker), New York: Garland; London: St. James Press, 1992, 1195–1199.

"The Defense of Terrorism: Trotsky and his Major Critics" in The Trotsky Reappraisal (ed. Terry Brotherstone and Paul Dukes), Edinburgh: Edinburgh University Press, 1992, 156–65.

"Jose Maria Ferrater Mora (1912-1991)," Man and World, Vol. 25 (1992): 1–2.

"The Systematic Ambiguity of Some Key Whiteheadian Terms" in Metaphysics as Foundation: Essays in Honor of Ivor Leclerc (ed. Paul A. Bogaard and Gordon Treash), Albany: State University of New York Press, 1993, 150–63.

"Changing Russian Assessments of Spinoza and their German Sources (1796-1862)" in Philosophical Imagination and Cultural Memory: Appropriating Historical Traditions (ed. Patricia Cook), Durham: Duke University Press, 1993, 176–194. An earlier version of this paper, in French translation by Jacqueline Lagrée, appeared in 1985. See No. 89 above.

"The Potential Contribution of Classical Russian Philosophy to the Building of a Humane Society in Russia" in XIX World Congress of Philosophy (Moscow 22–28 August 1993): Lectures, Moscow, 1993: 34–50.

"Joseph Brodsky" in Contemporary World Writers (ed. Tracy Chevalier), London: St. James Press, 1993, 75–77.

Articles on Nicholas Berdyaev and "Russian Thinkers on the Historical Present and Future" in Encyclopedia of Time (ed. Samuel L. Macey), New York: Garland 1994, 53-54 and 537–39.

"Nikolai P. Poltoratzky (1921-1990)," SST Vol XX (XXXX): X-x

"Seven by Ten: An Examination of Seven Pairs of Translations from Akhmatova by Ten English and American Translators," Slavic and East European Journal, Vol. 38 (1994): 47–68.

"The Hegelian Roots of S. L. Frank's Ethics and Social Philosophy," The Owl of Minerva, Vol. 25 (1994): 195–08.

"Skovoroda's Metaphysics" in Hryhorij Savyč Skovoroda: An Anthology of Critical Articles (ed. Thomas E. Bird and Richard H. Marshall Jr.), Edmonton and Toronto: Canadian Institute of Ukrainian Studies Press, 1994, 223–37.

Articles on Michael Bakunin, Nicolas Berdyaev, Alexander Herzen, Russian Nihilism, Russian Philosophy, and Vladimir Solovyov in Cambridge Dictionary of Philosophy (ed. Robert Audi), Cambridge: Cambridge University Press, 1995, 62–63, 70–71, 324–25, 702–04, and 751–52.

"Vospominaniia o A. F. Loseve" ("Reminiscences of A. F. Losev"), Nachala [Moscow], No. 2-4 (1994): 63–73.

"La Posible contribución de la filosofía clásica rusa a la construcción de una sociedad humanista," Diálogo filosófico [Madrid], No. 31 (1995), 77-90 (Spanish translation, by María del Carmen Dolby Múgica and Luz-Marina Pérez Horna, with the assistance of Leopoldo Montoya, of a revised and expanded version of No. 113 above.)

Article on Stanislav Volsky in Biographical Dictionary of Twentieth-Century Philosophers (ed. Stuart Brown, et al.), London and New York: Routledge, 1996, 814.

"George L. Kline on A. F. Losev," Khristos voskrese! A Newsletter for Russian Orthodox Philosophy, Vol. 3, No.2 (April 5, 1996), 3–4. (A partial English version of No. 121 above).

"Meditations of a Russian Neo-Husserlian: Gustav Shpet's 'The Skeptic and His Soul'" in Phenomenology and Skepticism: Essays in Honor of James M. Edie (ed. Brice R. Wachterhauser), Evanston: Northwestern University Press, 1996, 144–63; 249–54.

"The Religious Roots of S. L. Frank's Ethics and Social Philosophy" in Russian Religious Thought (ed. Judith Deutsch Kornblatt and Richard F. Gustafson), Madison: University of Wisconsin Press, 1996, 213–33.

"Gegel' i Solov'ev," Voprosy filosofii, [Moscow] No. 10 (1996): 84–95. (Russian translation by Olga D. Volkogonova, edited by Nelly V. Motroshilova, of a slightly revised version of No. 64 above.)

"A History of Brodsky's Ostanovka v pustyne and his Selected Poems," Modern Poetry In Translation, No. 10 (1996): 8–19.

Article on Konstantin Leont'ev in Encyclopedia of the Essay (ed. Tracy Chevalier), London: Fitzroy Dearborn, 1997, 471–73.

"Skovoroda: In but Not Of the Eighteenth Century. A Commentary," Journal of Ukrainian Studies [Toronto], Vol. 22, No. 1-2 (1997): 117–23.

Articles on Konstantin Leont'ev and Aleksei Losev in Routledge Encyclopedia of Philosophy (ed. Edward Craig), London: Routledge, 1998, Vol. 5, 567-70 and 828–33.

"Istoriia dvukh knig" ("A History of Two Books") in Iosif Brodskii: Trudy i dni (Joseph Brodsky: Works and Days) (ed. Lev Loseff and Petr Vail), Moscow: Izdatel'stvo Nezavisimaia gazeta, 1998, 215–228. (Russian Translation by Lev Loseff of No. 133 above.)

"Petr Yakovlevich Chaadaev" in Dictionary of Literary Biography, Vol. 198, The Age of Pushkin and Gogol: Prose (ed. Christine A. Rydel), Detroit: Gale Research, 1998, 101–09.

"Gustav Shpet as Interpreter of Hegel" in Archiwum Historii Filozofii i Myśli Społecznej (Warsaw) (special issue dedicated to Andrzej Walicki, ed. Z. Ogonowski), Vol. 44 (1999): 181–90.

Articles on Michael Bakunin, Nicolas Berdyaev, Alexander Herzen, Russian Nihilism, Russian Philosophy, and Vladimir Solovyov in Cambridge Dictionary of Philosophy, (ed. Robert Audi), Cambridge: Cambridge University Press, 1999: 71, 81, 378–79, 805-06 and 862.

"Soviet Ethical Theory" in Encyclopedia of Ethics (ed. Lawrence C. Becker and Charlotte B. Becker), New York and London: Routledge, 2nd ed. 2001, cols.. 1631–1637. (This is a revised and updated version of No. 109 above. It contains two new sections: "Post-Soviet Developments," col. 1635, and "Post-Soviet Sources," cols. 1636–1637.)

"Karta stikhotvoreniia poeta" in Iosif Brodskii: Bol'shaia kniga interv'iu (ed. Valentina Polukhina), Moscow: Zakharov, 2nd ed., revised and expanded, 2000, 13–16. (Russian text of No. 62 above.)

Reminiscences of A. F. Losev," Russian Studies in Philosophy, Vol. 40 No. 3 (2001-2002): 74-82. (English text of No. 121 above, with additional annotation. A partial English text had appeared as "George L. Kline on A. F. Losev"; see No. 125 above.)

"A Poet's Map of His Poem: An Interview with George L. Kline" in Joseph Brodsky's Conversations (ed. Cynthia L. Haven), Jackson: University of Mississippi Press, 2002: 36–39. (Reprint of No. 63 above.)

"W. E. Hocking on Marx, Russian Marxism, and the Soviet Union" in A William Ernest Hocking Reader (ed. John Lachs and D. Micah Hester), Nashville: Vanderbilt University Press, 2004: 349–66.

"Five Paradoxes in Losev's Life and Work," Russian Studies in philosophy, Vol. 44, No. 1 (2005): 13–32.

"Brodsky's Presepio in the Context of His Other Nativity Poems," Symposion: A Journal of Russian Thought, Vols. 7-12 (2002-2007): 67–80.

"Taras D. Zakydalsky (1941-2007), Russian Studies in Philosophy, Vol. XX (2008): XX-XX

"Foreword" in Evgenia Cherkasova, Dostoevsky and Kant: Dialogues on Ethics, Amsterdam and New York: Rodopi, 2009, xi-xii.

"The Soviet Recourse to the Death Penalty for Crimes against Socialist Property (1961-1986)," Sofia Philosophical Review, Vol. 3, No. 1 (2009): 45–74.

"Shpet as Translator of Hegel's Phänomenologie des Geistes" in Gustav Shpet's Contribution to Philosophy and Cultural Theory, (ed. Galin Tihanov), W. Lafayette, IN: Purdue University Press, 2009, 134–150.

The Rise and Fall of Soviet 'Orthographic Atheism'," Symposion: A Journal of Russian Thought, Vol. 14 (2009): 1-18.

"Skepticism and Faith in Shestov's Early Critique of Rationalism," Studies in East European Thought, Vol. 63, No. 1 (2011): 15–29.

"Discussions with Bocheński concerning Soviet Marxism-Leninism, 1952-1986," Studies in East European Thought, Vol. 64, No. 3-4 (2012): 301–12.

"A Russian Orthodox Source of Soviet Scientific-Technological Prometheanism," Sofia Philosophical Review, Vol. 7, No. 1 (2013): 27–50.

"Piat' paradoksov v zhizni i tvorchestve Loseva" forthcoming in A. F. Losev i gumanitarnye nauki dvadtsatogo veka (ed. E. Takho-Godi and V. Marchenkov), Moscow: Nauka, 2014. (Russian translation by A. Vashestov, edited by V. Marchenkov, of No. 142 above.)

Selected shorter translations

Vladimir Soloviev 
Vladimir Solovyov, "Lectures on Godmanhood" in The Portable Nineteenth-Century Russian Reader (ed. George Gibian), Harmondsworh and New York: Penguin Books, 1993, 630-637 (a revised version of pp. 76–84 of the translation included in Russian Philosophy, vol. 3; see No. 8 above).

Pushkin 
"Alexander Pushkin" by Mikhail Zoshchenko, Columbia Review, Vol. 27, No. 3 (1947): 19–20.

Tolstoy 
Leo Tolstoy, "A History of Yesterday", Russian Review, Vol. 8 (1949), 142–60. Reprinted in Leo Tolstoy: Short Stories (ed. Ernest J. Simmons), New York: Modern Library, 1964, 1-22. Reprinted, with revisions and abridgments, in Columbia University Forum, Vol. 2, No. 3, (1959), 32–38. The 1959 revision is reprinted in The Portable Tolstoy (ed. John Bayley), New York: Viking, 1978, pp. 35–47. The Full text is reprinted, with additional revisions, in Tolstoy's Short Fiction (ed. Michael R. Katz), New York: W. W. Norton, 1991: 279–94.

Karl Jaspers 
From the German manuscript: E. Latzel, "The Concept of 'Ultimate Situation' in Jaspers' Philosophy" in The Philosophy of Karl Jaspers (Library of Living Philosophers, ed. P. A. Schilpp), New York: Tudor, 1957: 177–208.

Shestov 
Lev Shestov, "In Memory of a Great Philosopher: Edmund Husserl," 3:248-76 (originally in Philosophy and Phenomenological Research, Vol. 22 [1962], 449–71. This translation was reprinted in Lev Shestov, Speculation and Revelation [translated by Bernard Martin] Athens: Ohio University press, 1982, 267–93, and translated into Polish by Halina Krahelska as "Egzystencjalizm jako krytyka fenomenologii" ["Existentialism as a Critique of Phenomenology"] in Filozofia egzystencjalna ["Existintial Philosophy"] [ed. L. Kolakowski and K. Pomian], Warsaw: PWN, 1965: 212–44); Alexander Bogdanov,

Pasternak 
"Two Poems by Boris Pasternak" in the Columbia University Forum Anthology (ed. Peter Spackman and Lee Ambrose), New York: Atheneum, 1968: 48–51. (Originally in Columbia University Forum, Vol. 2, 1959.) Reprinted, with revisions, in Boris Pasternak: Seven Poems, 1969, 1972.

Joseph Brodsky
" 'Elegy for John Donne' by Joseph Brodsky" (with introductory essay), Russian Review, Vol. 24 (1965): 341–53.

"New Poems by Joseph Brodsky [Elegy for John Donne, A Christmas Ballad, "That evening sprawling by an open fire," Solitude and Sadly and Tenderly] (with introductory note), TriQuarterly 3 (Spring 1965), 85–96. Also includesAndrei Voznesensky's Oza, 97–117.

"Three Poems by Brodsky" [The Pushkin Monument, Pilgrims, To Gleb Gorbovski,] Russian Review, Vol. 25. (1966): 131–34.

"Joseph Brodsky's 'Verses on the Death of T.S. Eliot'" (with introductory note), Russian Review, Vol. 27 (1968): 195–98.

Joseph Brodsky: Six New Poems [To Lycomedes on Scyros, Washerwoman Bridge, Sonnet: How Sad that my Life has not Come to Mean, Verses on The Death T. S. Eliot, The Fountain, A Stopping Place in the Wilderness, (with introductory essay), Unicorn Journal, No. 2 (1968): 20–30.

"Joseph Brodsky's 'A Winter Evening in Yalta'," The Observer Review (London), January 11, 1970: 29.

Two Poems by Joseph Brodsky [A Prophecy and Two Hours Down by the Reservoir] in Explorations in Freedom: Prose, Narrative, and Poetry from Kultura (ed. Leopold Tyrmand), New York: The Free Press in cooperation with The State University of New York at Albany, 1970, 265–70.

"Joseph Brodsky's "Now that I've walled myself off from the world'," The Third Hour, No. 9 (1970),Page

Five Poems by Joseph Brodsky [Almost an Elegy, Enigna for an Angel, Stanzas: ("Let our farewell be silent"), "You'll flutter, robin redbreast," The Candlestick], TriQuarterly 18 (Spring 1970): 175–83.

"Joseph Brodsky's 'Adieu, Mademoiselle Véronique' "(with introductory note), Russian Review, Vol. 30 (1971): 27–32.

Three Poems by Joseph Brodsky, [Verses in April, September First, Sonnet ("Once more we're living as by Naples Bay")], Arroy (Bryn Mawr Literary Review), May, 1971: 2–4.

"Six Poems by Joseph Brodsky," [Aeneas and Dido, "I bent to kiss your shoulders and I saw," "The trees in my window, in my wooden-framed window," "The fire as you can hear is dying down," January 1, 1965, and A Letter in a Bottle], Russian Literature TriQuarterly, No. 1 (1971): 76–90.

"Joseph Brodsky's 'Nature Morte'," Saturday Review: The Arts, Vol. 55, No. 3 (August 12, 1972): 45.

Eight Poems by Joseph Brodsky [A Halt in the Wilderness, To a Certain Poetess, Adieu, Mademoiselle Véronique, New Stanzas to Augusta, Verses on the Death of T.S. Eliot, The Fountain, Post Aetatem Nostram, Nature Morte] (Russian texts on facing pages) in The Living Mirror: Five Young Poets form Leningrad (ed. Suzanne Massie), New York: Doubleday, 1972: 228–99. Also A Chapter About Crosses by Costantine Kuzminsky: 322–24.

Eight Poems by Joseph Brodsky [Sonnet ("The month of January has flown past"), "You're coming home again. What does that mean?", "In villages God does not live only," Spring Season of Muddy Roads, "Exhaustion now is a more frequent guest," Evening, "Refusing to catalogue all of one's woes," Einem alten Architekten in Rom] (with introductory note), Antaeus, No. 6 (1972): 99–113.

Three Poems by Joseph Brodsky [Two Hours in an Empty Tank, September the First, " Quilt-jacketed, a tree-surgeon"], New Leader, Vol. 55, No. 24 (Dec. 11, 1972): 3–4.

"Joseph Brodsky's 'The tenant finds his new house wholly strange'," The Nation, Vol. 216, No. 1 (Jan. 1, 1973), 28.

Three Poems by Joseph Brodsky ["The days glide over me," "In villages God does not live only," and, From Gorbunov and Gorchakov, Canto X: "And silence is the future of all days" (with introductory essay), Mademoiselle, Vol. 76, No. 4 (Feb. 1973): 138–39, 188–90.

Three Poems by Joseph Brodsky [From The School Anthology: Albert Frolov: Odysseus to Telemachus: and From Gorbunov and Gorchakov, Canto II] (with

introductory essay), New York Review of Books, Vol. 20, No. 5 (April 5, 1973): 10–12.

"Joseph Brodsky's 'Dido and Aeneas'," Partisan Review, Vol. 40, No. 2 (1973): 255.

"Joseph Brodsky's 'Nunc Dimittis'," Vogue, Vol. 162, No. 3 (Sept. 1973): 286–87.

"Joseph Brodsky's 'An Autumn evening in the modest square'," Confrontation, No. 8, (Spring 1974): 20–21.

"Joseph Brodsky's Letters to a Roman Friend, Los Angeles Times, June 16, 1974, pt.5: 3.

"Joseph Brodsky's Nature Morte, Post-War Russian Poetry (ed. Daniel Weissbort), London: Penguin Books, 1974, 263-268.

"Josephs Brodsky's The Butterfly, New Yorker, March 15, 1976: 35.

Three Poems by Joseph Brodsky [Sadly and Tenderly, A Winter Evening In Yalta, and A Prophecy] in The Contemporary World Poets (ed. Donald Junkins), New York: Harcourt Brace Jovanovich, 1976, 268-271.

"Joseph Brodsky's 'In the Lake District' and 'On the Death of Zhukov'," Kontinent, Garden City, NY: Doubleday Anchor Books, 1976, 119–121. ('In the Lake District' is reprinted from Mademoiselle, May 1976; an earlier version appeared in the Bryn Mawr Alumnae Bulletin, Fall 1974.)

"Two Poems by Joseph Brodsky" ["That evening, sprawling by an open fire," Verses on the Death of T. S. Eliot,] in Russian Writing Today (ed. Robin Milner-Gulland and Martin Dewhirst), London: Penguin Books, 1977, 179–183.

"Joseph Brodsky's 'A second Christmas by the shore'," Paintbrush, Vol. 4, No. 7-8. (1977): 27.

"Joseph Brodsky's 'Plato Elaborated'," New Yorker, March 12, 1979: 40–41.

Ten Poems by Joseph Brodsky ["The second Christmas by the shore," Nature Morte, Letters to a Roman Friend, Nunc Dimittis, Odysseus to Telemachus, "An autumn evening in the modest square," In the Lake District, The Butterfly, On the Death of Zhukov, Plato Elaborated] in A Part of Speech (poems translated by various hands), New Yorker: Farrar, Straus, and Giroux, 1980.

"Joseph Brodsky's 'Odysseus to Telemachus'" (reprinted from A Part of Speech [New York: Farrar, Straus, and Giroux, 1981], 58) in Poetry: An Introduction (by Ruth Miller and Robert A. Greenberg), New York: St. Martin's Press, 1981: 372.

Joseph Brodsky's December in Florence (with Maurice English), Shearsman, No. 7 (1982): 19–21.

Joseph Brodsky's Eclogue V: Summer (with the author), New Yorker, August 3, 1987: 22–24.

Joseph Brodsky's Eclogue V: Summer (with the author), in his book To Urania (poems translated by various hands), New York: Farrar, Straus, and Giroux, 1988, 82–89.

Joseph Brodsky's Advice to a Traveller (with the author), Times Literary Supplement (London), May 12–18, 1989, 516. Reprinted in Keath Fraser, Worst Journeys: The Picador Book of Travel, New York: Vintage Books, 1991, 3–6. Retitled "An Admonition," this was reprinted in Brodsky's So Forth, New York: Farrar, Straus, and Giroux, 1996, 16–20.

Marina Tsvetayeva 
"Five Poems by Marina Tsvetayeva," Russian Literature TriQuarterly, No. 2 (1972): 217–19. (Reprinted, with revisions, from Arroy, May 1969.)

Valentina Sinkevich 
"Four Poems by Valentina Sinkevich" in Valentina Sinkevich, The Coming of Day (bilingual edition), Philadelphia: Crossroads, 1978, 13, 17, 21, 24.

Alexander Radishchev 
Alexander Radishchev, "On Man, His Mortality and Immortality" (with Frank Y. Gladney) in A History of Russian Philosophy (ed. Valery A. Kuvakin), Buffalo: Prometheus Books, 1994; 1:113-128 (an abridged and slightly revised version of the translation included in Russian Philosophy, vol. 1; see No 8 above). Constantine Leontyev, "The Average European as an Ideal and Instrument of Universal Destruction" (with William Shafer) in ibid., 2:455-462 (an abridged and extensively revised version of the translation included in Russian Philosophy, vol. 2; see No. 8 above)

Other short translations 
Leszek Kolakowski, "The Epistemological Significance of the Aetiology of Knowledge" (with Helen R. Segall), TriQuarterly 22 (Fall 1971): 221–38.
Igor Sidorov, "The Philosophy of Pavel Florenskii and the Future of Russian Culture," Russian Studies in philosophy, Vol. 33 (1995): 41–48.

A. I. Vvedensky, "The Atheism of Spinoza's Philosophy" in The Concept of God: Essays on Spinoza by Aleksandr Vvedensky and Vladimir Solovyov (ed. Robert Bird), Carlisle, Pa: Variable Press, 1999, 1-23.

"Correspondence of A. F. Losev and George L. Kline (1957-1974)," Russian Studies in philosophy, Vol. 40, No. 3 (2001-2002), 69–73. Translation of the Russian texts published in XB: A Newsletter for Russian Thought, Vol. 7, Nos. 4-6 (November 2000): 6–8.

A. N. Kolmogorov, "Solution of a problem in Probability Theory Connected with the Problem of the Mechanism of Stratification," No. 53 in a series published by the American Mathematical Society, New York, 1951 (without identification of translator).

From the Spanish manuscript: José Ferrater Mora, "The Philosophy of Xavier Zubiri" in European Philosophy Today (ed. George L. Kline), Chicago: Quadrangle Books, 1965: 15–24.

Translations of Russian philosophic texts in Russian Philosophy (ed. James M. Edie, James P. Scalan, Mary-Barabara Zeldin, and George L. Kline), (3vols.), Chicago: Quadrangle Books, 1965; revised paperback edition, 1969, reprinted, University of Tennessee Press, 1976, 1984: Gregory Skovoroda, "Socrates in Russia," A Conversation among Five Travelers Concerning Life's True Happiness," and "The Life of Gregory Skovoroda by M. I. Kovalinsky," 1:17-57; Alexander Radishchev, "On Man, his Mortality and Immortality"(with Frank Y. Gladney), 1:77-100; Constantine Leontyev,

"The Average European as an Ideal and Instrument of Universal Destruction" (with William Shafer), 2:271-80; Nicholas Fyodorov, "The Question of Brotherhood..." (with Ashleigh E. Moorhouse), 3:16-54;

"Matter as Thing-in Itself," 3:393-04; Lyubov Akselrod (Ortodoks), "Review of Lenin's Materialism and Empiriocriticism" (with John Liesveld Jr.), 3:457-63.

See also
Mikhail Epstein
James H. Billington
List of Russian philosophers

Notes

References
Luft, Eric v.d., "Kline, George Louis (1921- )." Dictionary of Modern American Philosophers, edited by John R. Shook (Bristol, England: Thoemmes Continuum, 2005), vol. 3, pp. 1321-1322.
"Philos. Sovietology: The Pursuit of a Science" (ed. H. Dahm, T. Blakeley, and G. Kline) Dordrecht: Reidel, 1988.
"Russian Thought After Communism: The Recovery of a Philosophical Heritage, (ed. James P. Scanlan), New Yori: M. E. Sharpep, 1994. Dedication: "The authors dedicate this volume to GEORGE L. KLINE in recognition of his unique and invaluable scholarly contributions to the study of Russian philosophy and in grateful acknowledgment of the generous help and encouragement he has given to so many other scholars in the field". Personal information in essay by James P. Scanlan," George L. Kline: An Appreciation," pp. xiii-xviii. --3) and article "George L. Kline's Influence on the Study of Russian and Soviet Philosophy in the United States" (pp. 243–266). If you quote by Philip T. Grier, p. 262 
"Hegel, History, and Interpretation" (ed. Shaun Gallagher), Albany: SUNY Press, 1997. It bears this dedication: "We dedicate this volume to GLK, teacher and colleague, in recognition of his singular and invaluable scholarly contributions to Hegel studies and in grateful acknowledgment for the generous help and encouragement he has provided to so many scholars in a great variety of fields."

External links
Harvard Book Review
Cardinal Points Personal Info Page
New York Book Review

1921 births
2014 deaths
American translators
Bryn Mawr College faculty
Columbia College (New York) alumni
Columbia University faculty
Hegel scholars
Philosophers from Illinois
Spinoza scholars
Presidents of the Metaphysical Society of America